Kadar may refer to:

People

First name
Kadar Brock (born 1980), American contemporary abstract artist
Ka'dar Hollman (born 1996), American football player
Kadar Khan, an alternate spelling of Kader Khan (born 1935/1936), Indian actor

Last name
Danny Kadar (born 1969), American producer, engineer, and mixer
Gyula Kadar (disambiguation), several people
János Kádár (1912–1989), Hungarian communist party and government leader
M. A. Kadar (born 1942), Indian politician

Places
Kadar, Russia, a rural locality near Karamakhi in the Republic of Dagestan, Russia
Kādar, alternative spelling of Kodur-e Bala, a village in Kerman Province, Iran

Other
Kadar language, a Dravidian language of Kerala and Tamil Nadu
Kadar people, one of the scheduled tribes of India

See also
Kádár, a Hungarian surname
The Night of Kadar, 1978 science fiction novel by Garry Kilworth

Language and nationality disambiguation pages